The following is a list of collaborations performed by Belgian world music singer Natacha Atlas and other music artists.

Collaborations

References

External links
Official website

Collaborations
Atlas, Natacha